Aiducation International (AI, commonly known as Aiducation), founded in 2007, is an international "for impact" non-profit organization (NPO) in the field of education. It sources scholarships from private persons in developed countries (the donors are called "AiduMakers") and awards these scholarships on a merit basis to needy students in developing countries. Its focus is on Kenya and on the Philippines.

Need
While the Kenyan population has access to free-of-charge primary education, few families can afford secondary school education for their kids. Every year, this forces thousands of students to drop out of school. Consequently, talent, creativity, motivation and drive are lost – potential needed for the economic, social and political development of Kenya.

Information
 AiduMakers can award the scholarship to the student they believe in most. The scholarship is named after the AiduMaker (f.e. "Frank-Smith-Scholarship")
 Aiducation International has chapters on three continents.
 Aiducation International spends more than 90% of all scholarship donations directly on education.
 Aiducation International was founded in 2006. Today, Aiducation International is run by volunteers (called Aiducators) with chapters in Germany, Kenya, UK, USA, and Switzerland.

2006:

AI started as an NGO startup with roots in Kenya. In February 2006, members of the Kenyan civil society founded the organization- Pwani Education Welfare Association (PEWA), which soon became Aiducation International Kenya.

2007:

AI Schweiz was founded in September 2007. In the same month and thanks to the first AiduMakers, Aiducation was able to award the first two scholarships to poor but high performing students.

2008:

The first "Mentorship Academy" took place in Kenya. During the event, scholars meet to network, learn from guest speakers as well as from each other, and participate in workshops on how to make their country a better place.

2009:

Chapters were opened in Germany and Singapore. The indirect impact of the scholars of Aiducation International became visible for the first time as one of the scholars organized fundraising events against a famine in northern Kenya.

Since its inception, Aiducation has provided more than 300 Kenyan students with scholarships.

Awards
VentureKick award 
Reboot grant 
Procter & Gamble Alumni Grant to finance Mentorship Academies in 2010.

Organization structure
Aiducation International (the umbrella organization) has national chapters in developed as well as developing countries. The chapters in developed countries are for the purpose of raising scholarships as opposed to those in developing countries which exist to provide scholarships to bright and needy students. The scholarship-raising chapters (Switzerland, Germany, UK and Singapore) have contact with potential AiduMakers and the talent-raising chapters (Kenya) have contact with potential scholars. The latter are responsible for the recruitment and pre-selection of students as well as mentoring of scholars.

AI is made up of "Aiducators" and most of them work on a voluntarily basis. Aiducators are typically students and young professionals who understand the importance of funding the education of a bright and needy student.

Merit-based scholarships
Aiducation International sources scholarships for bright and poor children to fund their secondary school education. Typically, these students (called "AiduFellows") are above-average performers and would have dropped out of school due to financial constraints. Donors to Aiducation International, who award these merit-based scholarships are known as AiduMakers. AiduMakers can choose which student receives their scholarships from among Aiducation's pool of applications, and the scholarship is named after the AiduMaker (e.g. "Thomas-Smith-Scholarship"). Aiducation encourages its AiduMakers to build a one-to-one relationship with the AiduFellows they support and allows them to monitor the progress of the student through annual progress reports.

In the news
Aiducation International has received media coverage:
Neue Zürcher Zeitung (NZZ): 19 Jun 2009, "Ein startup, das die Welt verändern will" (in German: in this article and the associated podcast two of the founders describe the young history of Aiducation International and about Aiducation's way of helping people help themselves)
20min: 19 Aug 2008, "Oberschulbildung für alle" (in German: the article is a general feature of the organization to the public)
ilsole24ore: 15 Mar 2009, "Impegno nel no profit per Florian Kowalke" (in Italian: an article describing how one of the founders, Florian Kowalke, became a founder of Aiducation International)
Neue Zürcher Zeitung (NZZ): 20 Oct 2009, "Ein Kick für eine gute Sache" (in German: the newspaper article is about one of the most important Swiss startup prizes that Aiducation won in 2009)
Die Zeit: 19 Nov 2009, "Das können WIR tun" (in German: the article uses the organization to exemplify useful approaches in modern development aid)

External links
 Aiducation official website
 Donate a scholarship
 Get involved with Aiducation
 An interview with Dr. Florian Kowalke, co-founder of Aiducation International

Notes and references

International educational charities
Educational organisations based in Kenya
Educational charities
Charities based in Kenya
2007 establishments in Kenya